Chrysanthos Sisinis (Greek: Χρύσανθος Σισίνης, died 1845) was a Greek revolutionary leader and a politician.

He was born in Gastouni and was the son of Georgios Sisinis.  He fought at the battles of Patras, Athens, Messolongi and several other battles.  He was jailed together with his father in the civil period as an adherent of Kolokotronis. After his release, he entered politics and was elected many times as a representative for Elis.  He died in 1845.

References
Πελοποννήσιοι αγωνιστές του 1821, Νικηταρά απομνημονεύματα ("Peloponnesian Revolutionary Leaders of 1891, Nikitaras' Memoirs"), Fotakou, Vergina, Athens 1996
Ιστορία της Ελληνικής επανάστασης ("History of the Greek Revolution"), Spyridonos Trikoupis, Nea Synora-Livani Publishers, Athens 1993, SET 
The first version of the article is translated and is based from the article at the Greek Wikipedia (el:Main Page)

1845 deaths
Greek military leaders of the Greek War of Independence
Politicians from Elis
Year of birth unknown
Greek prisoners and detainees
Chrysanthos
People from Gastouni